The 89th United States Congress was a meeting of the legislative branch of the United States federal government, composed of the United States Senate and the United States House of Representatives. It met in Washington, D.C., from January 3, 1965, to January 3, 1967, during the second and third years of Lyndon B. Johnson's presidency.  The apportionment of seats in the House of Representatives was based on the 1960 United States census.

Both chambers had a Democratic supermajority, and with the election of President Lyndon B. Johnson to his own term in office, maintaining an overall federal government trifecta. This is the last time Democrats or any party had a 2/3rd supermajority in the Senate. 

The 89th Congress is regarded as "arguably the most productive in American history". Some of its landmark legislation includes Social Security Amendments of 1965 (the creation of Medicare and Medicaid), the Voting Rights Act, Higher Education Act, Immigration and Nationality Act of 1965, Elementary and Secondary Education Act and the Freedom of Information Act.

Major events

 January 4, 1965: President Johnson proclaimed his "Great Society" during his State of the Union Address.
 January 20, 1965: Inauguration of President Lyndon B. Johnson for a full term.
 November 8, 1966: United States elections, 1966, including:
 United States Senate elections, 1966
 United States House of Representatives elections, 1966

Major legislation 

 April 11, 1965: Elementary and Secondary Education Act, 
 July 27, 1965: Federal Cigarette Labeling and Advertising Act, 
 July 30, 1965: Social Security Act of 1965,  (including Medicaid and Medicare)
 August 6, 1965: Voting Rights Act, 
 August 10, 1965: Housing and Urban Development Act of 1965, 
 August 26, 1965: Public Works and Economic Development Act of 1965, 
 September 9, 1965 Department of Housing and Urban Development Act, 
 September 29, 1965: National Foundation on the Arts and the Humanities Act, 
 October 3, 1965: Immigration and Nationality Act of 1965, (Hart-Celler Act, INS Act) 
 October 6, 1965: Heart Disease, Cancer, and Stroke Amendments, 
 October 20, 1965: Motor Vehicle Air Pollution Control Act,  (including Solid Waste Disposal Act)
 October 22, 1965: Highway Beautification Act, 
 November 8, 1965: Higher Education Act, 
 November 8, 1965: Vocational Rehabilitation Act Amendments 
 August 26, 1966: Laboratory Animal Welfare Act Now called the Animal Welfare Act 
 April 13, 1966: Uniform Time Act, 
 July 13, 1966: Cotton Research and Promotion Act, 
 September 6, 1966: , which (among other things) enacted what is now called the Freedom of Information Act
 September 9, 1966: National Traffic and Motor Vehicle Safety Act, 
 September 9, 1966: Highway Safety Act, 
 October 15, 1966: National Historic Preservation Act, 
 October 15, 1966: National Wildlife Refuge System Administration Act of 1966, 
 October 15, 1966: Department of Transportation Act, 
 November 2, 1966: Cuban Adjustment Act, 
 November 3, 1966: Comprehensive Health, Planning and Service Act,

Constitutional amendments

 July 6, 1965: Approved an amendment to the United States Constitution addressing succession to the presidency and establishing procedures both for filling a vacancy in the office of the vice president, and for responding to presidential disabilities, and submitted it to the state legislatures for ratification
 Amendment was later ratified on February 10, 1967, becoming the 25th Amendment to the United States Constitution

Party summary
The count below identifies party affiliations at the beginning of the first session of this Congress, and includes members from vacancies and newly admitted states, when they were first seated. Changes resulting from subsequent replacements are shown below in the "Changes in membership" section.

Senate

House of Representatives

Leadership

Senate 
 President: Hubert Humphrey (D), starting January 20, 1965
 President pro tempore: Carl Hayden (D)
 Permanent Acting President pro tempore: Lee Metcalf (D)

Majority (Democratic) leadership 

 Majority Leader and Democratic Conference Chairman: Mike Mansfield 
 Majority Whip: Russell B. Long 
 Caucus Secretary: George Smathers

Minority (Republican) leadership 

 Minority Leader: Everett Dirksen 
 Minority Whip: Thomas Kuchel 
 Republican Conference Chairman: Leverett Saltonstall 
 Republican Conference Secretary: Milton Young 
 National Senatorial Committee Chair: Thruston Ballard Morton 
 Policy Committee Chairman: Bourke B. Hickenlooper

House of Representatives 
 Speaker: John W. McCormack (D)

Majority (Democratic) leadership 

 Majority Leader: Carl Albert 
 Majority Whip: Hale Boggs 
 Democratic Caucus Chairman: Eugene James Keogh 
 Democratic Caucus Secretary: Leonor Sullivan 
 Democratic Campaign Committee Chairman: Michael J. Kirwan

Minority (Republican) leadership 
 Minority Leader: Gerald Ford 
 Minority Whip: Leslie C. Arends 
 Republican Conference Chairman: Melvin Laird 
 Policy Committee Chairman: John Jacob Rhodes
 Republican Campaign Committee Chairman: Bob Wilson

Caucuses
 House Democratic Caucus
 Senate Democratic Caucus

Members
This list is arranged by chamber, then by state. Senators are listed in order of seniority, and representatives are listed by district.

Senate
Senators are popularly elected statewide every two years, with one-third beginning new six-year terms with each Congress. Preceding the names in the list below are Senate class numbers, which indicate the cycle of their election. In this Congress, Class 1 meant their term began in this Congress, requiring reelection in 1970; Class 2 meant their term ended with this Congress, requiring reelection in 1966; and Class 3 meant their term began in the last Congress, requiring reelection in 1968.

Alabama 
 3. J. Lister Hill (D)
 2. John Sparkman (D)

Alaska 
 2. Bob Bartlett (D)
 3. Ernest Gruening (D)

Arizona 
 3. Carl Hayden (D)
 1. Paul Fannin (R)

Arkansas 
 2. John L. McClellan (D)
 3. J. William Fulbright (D)

California 
 3. Thomas Kuchel (R)
 1. George Murphy (R)

Colorado 
 2. Gordon Allott (R)
 3. Peter H. Dominick (R)

Connecticut 
 1. Thomas J. Dodd (D)
 3. Abraham Ribicoff (D)

Delaware 
 1. John J. Williams (R)
 2. J. Caleb Boggs (R)

Florida 
 1. Spessard Holland (D)
 3. George Smathers (D)

Georgia 
 2. Richard Russell Jr. (D)
 3. Herman Talmadge (D)

Hawaii 
 1. Hiram Fong (R)
 3. Daniel Inouye (D)

Idaho 
 3. Frank Church (D)
 2. Leonard B. Jordan (R)

Illinois 
 2. Paul Douglas (D)
 3. Everett Dirksen (R)

Indiana 
 1. Vance Hartke (D)
 3. Birch Bayh (D)

Iowa 
 3. Bourke B. Hickenlooper (R)
 2. Jack Miller (R)

Kansas 
 3. Frank Carlson (R)
 2. James B. Pearson (R)

Kentucky 
 2. John Sherman Cooper (R)
 3. Thruston Ballard Morton (R)

Louisiana 
 2. Allen J. Ellender (D)
 3. Russell B. Long (D)

Maine 
 2. Margaret Chase Smith (R)
 1. Edmund Muskie (D)

Maryland 
 3. Daniel Brewster (D)
 1. Joseph Tydings (D)

Massachusetts 
 2. Leverett Saltonstall (R)
 1. Ted Kennedy (D)

Michigan 
 2. Patrick V. McNamara (D), until April 30, 1966
 Robert P. Griffin (R), from May 11, 1966
 1. Philip Hart (D)

Minnesota 
 1. Eugene McCarthy (DFL)
 2. Walter Mondale (DFL)

Mississippi 
 2. James Eastland (D)
 1. John C. Stennis (D)

Missouri 
 1. Stuart Symington (D)
 3. Edward V. Long (D)

Montana 
 1. Mike Mansfield (D)
 2. Lee Metcalf (D)

Nebraska 
 1. Roman Hruska (R)
 2. Carl Curtis (R)

Nevada 
 3. Alan Bible (D)
 1. Howard Cannon (D)

New Hampshire 
 3. Norris Cotton (R)
 2. Thomas J. McIntyre (D)

New Jersey 
 2. Clifford P. Case (R)
 1. Harrison A. Williams (D)

New Mexico 
 2. Clinton Anderson (D)
 1. Joseph Montoya (D)

New York 
 3. Jacob Javits (R)
 1. Robert F. Kennedy (D)

North Carolina 
 3. Sam Ervin (D)
 2. B. Everett Jordan (D)

North Dakota 
 3. Milton Young (R)
 1. Quentin Burdick (D-NPL)

Ohio 
 3. Frank Lausche (D)
 1. Stephen M. Young (D)

Oklahoma 
 3. Mike Monroney (D)
 2. Fred R. Harris (D)

Oregon 
 3. Wayne Morse (D)
 2. Maurine Neuberger (D)

Pennsylvania 
 3. Joseph S. Clark Jr. (D)
 1. Hugh Scott (R)

Rhode Island 
 1. John Pastore (D)
 2. Claiborne Pell (D)

South Carolina 
 3. Olin D. Johnston (D), until April 18, 1965
 Donald S. Russell (D), from April 22, 1965 – November 8, 1966
 Fritz Hollings (D), from November 9, 1966
 2. Strom Thurmond (R)

South Dakota 
 2. Karl E. Mundt (R)
 3. George McGovern (D)

Tennessee 
 1. Albert Gore Sr. (D)
 2. Ross Bass (D), until January 2, 1967

Texas 
 1. Ralph Yarborough (D)
 2. John Tower (R)

Utah 
 3. Wallace F. Bennett (R)
 1. Frank Moss (D)

Vermont 
 3. George Aiken (R)
 1. Winston L. Prouty (R)

Virginia 
 1. Harry F. Byrd (D), until November 10, 1965
 Harry F. Byrd Jr. (D), from November 12, 1965
 2. Absalom Willis Robertson (D), until December 30, 1966
 William B. Spong Jr. (D), from December 31, 1966

Washington 
 3. Warren Magnuson (D)
 1. Henry M. Jackson (D)

West Virginia 
 2. Jennings Randolph (D)
 1. Robert Byrd (D)

Wisconsin 
 1. William Proxmire (D)
 3. Gaylord Nelson (D)

Wyoming 
 1. Gale W. McGee (D)
 2. Milward Simpson (R)

House of Representatives 
Names of members are preceded by their district numbers.

Alabama 
 . Jack Edwards (R)
 . William Louis Dickinson (R)
 . George W. Andrews (D)
 . Glenn Andrews (R)
 . Armistead I. Selden Jr. (D)
 . John Hall Buchanan Jr. (R)
 . James D. Martin (R)
 . Robert E. Jones Jr. (D)

Alaska 
 . Ralph Julian Rivers (D), until December 30, 1966

Arizona 
 . John Jacob Rhodes (R)
 . Mo Udall (D)
 . George F. Senner Jr. (D)

Arkansas 
 . Ezekiel C. Gathings (D)
 . Wilbur Mills (D)
 . James William Trimble (D)
 . Oren Harris (D), until February 3, 1966
 David Pryor (D), from November 8, 1966

California 
 . Donald H. Clausen (R)
 . Harold T. Johnson (D)
 . John E. Moss (D)
 . Robert L. Leggett (D)
 . Phillip Burton (D)
 . William S. Mailliard (R)
 . Jeffery Cohelan (D)
 . George P. Miller (D)
 . Don Edwards (D)
 . Charles Gubser (R)
 . J. Arthur Younger (R)
 . Burt Talcott (R)
 . Charles M. Teague (R)
 . John F. Baldwin Jr. (R), until March 9, 1966
 Jerome Waldie (D), from June 7, 1966
 . John J. McFall (D)
 . B. F. Sisk (D)
 . Cecil R. King (D)
 . Harlan Hagen (D)
 . Chester E. Holifield (D)
 . H. Allen Smith (R)
 . Augustus Hawkins (D)
 . James C. Corman (D)
 . Del M. Clawson (R)
 . Glenard P. Lipscomb (R)
 . Ronald B. Cameron (D)
 . James Roosevelt (D), until September 30, 1965
 Thomas M. Rees (D), from December 15, 1965
 . Edwin Reinecke (R)
 . Alphonzo E. Bell Jr. (R)
 . George Brown Jr. (D)
 . Edward R. Roybal (D)
 . Charles H. Wilson (D)
 . Craig Hosmer (R)
 . Kenneth W. Dyal (D)
 . Richard T. Hanna (D)
 . James B. Utt (R)
 . Bob Wilson (R)
 . Lionel Van Deerlin (D)
 . John V. Tunney (D)

Colorado 
 . Byron G. Rogers (D)
 . Roy H. McVicker (D)
 . Frank Evans (D)
 . Wayne N. Aspinall (D)

Connecticut 
 . Emilio Q. Daddario (D)
 . William St. Onge (D)
 . Robert Giaimo (D)
 . Donald J. Irwin (D)
 . John S. Monagan (D)
 . Bernard F. Grabowski (D)

Delaware 
 . Harris McDowell (D)

Florida 
 . Bob Sikes (D)
 . Charles E. Bennett (D)
 . Claude Pepper (D)
 . Dante Fascell (D)
 . Syd Herlong (D)
 . Paul Rogers (D)
 . James A. Haley (D)
 . Donald Ray Matthews (D)
 . Don Fuqua (D)
 . Sam Gibbons (D)
 . Edward Gurney (R)
 . William C. Cramer (R)

Georgia 
 . George Elliott Hagan (D)
 . Maston E. O'Neal Jr. (D)
 . Bo Callaway (R)
 . James MacKay (D)
 . Charles L. Weltner (D)
 . John Flynt (D)
 . John William Davis (D)
 . J. Russell Tuten (D)
 . Phillip M. Landrum (D)
 . Robert Grier Stephens Jr. (D)

Hawaii 
 . Spark Matsunaga (D)
 . Patsy Mink (D)

Idaho 
 . Compton I. White Jr. (D)
 . George V. Hansen (R)

Illinois 
 . William L. Dawson (D)
 . Barratt O'Hara (D)
 . William T. Murphy (D)
 . Ed Derwinski (R)
 . John C. Kluczynski (D)
 . Daniel J. Ronan (D)
 . Frank Annunzio (D)
 . Dan Rostenkowski (D)
 . Sidney R. Yates (D)
 . Harold R. Collier (R)
 . Roman Pucinski (D)
 . Robert McClory (R)
 . Donald Rumsfeld (R)
 . John N. Erlenborn (R)
 . Charlotte Thompson Reid (R)
 . John B. Anderson (R)
 . Leslie C. Arends (R)
 . Robert H. Michel (R)
 . Gale Schisler (D)
 . Paul Findley (R)
 . Kenneth J. Gray (D)
 . William L. Springer (R)
 . George E. Shipley (D)
 . Melvin Price (D)

Indiana 
 . Ray Madden (D)
 . Charles A. Halleck (R)
 . John Brademas (D)
 . E. Ross Adair (R)
 . J. Edward Roush (D)
 . Richard L. Roudebush (R)
 . William G. Bray (R)
 . Winfield K. Denton (D), until December 30, 1966
 . Lee H. Hamilton (D)
 . Ralph Harvey (R), until December 30, 1966
 . Andrew Jacobs Jr. (D)

Iowa 
 . John R. Schmidhauser (D)
 . John Culver (D)
 . H. R. Gross (R)
 . Bert Bandstra (D)
 . Neal Edward Smith (D)
 . Stanley L. Greigg (D)
 . John R. Hansen (D)

Kansas 
 . Bob Dole (R)
 . Chester L. Mize (R)
 . Robert Ellsworth (R)
 . Garner E. Shriver (R)
 . Joe Skubitz (R)

Kentucky 
 . Frank Stubblefield (D)
 . William Natcher (D)
 . Charles R. Farnsley (D)
 . Frank Chelf (D)
 . Tim Lee Carter (R)
 . John C. Watts (D)
 . Carl D. Perkins (D)

Louisiana 
 . F. Edward Hébert (D)
 . Hale Boggs (D)
 . Edwin E. Willis (D)
 . Joe Waggonner (D)
 . Otto Passman (D)
 . James H. Morrison (D)
 . T. Ashton Thompson (D), until July 1, 1965
 Edwin Edwards (D), from October 2, 1965
 . Speedy Long (D)

Maine 
 . Stanley R. Tupper (R)
 . William Hathaway (D)

Maryland 
 . Carlton R. Sickles (D)
 . Rogers Morton (R)
 . Clarence Long (D)
 . Edward Garmatz (D)
 . George Hyde Fallon (D)
 . Hervey Machen (D)
 . Charles Mathias (R)
 . Samuel Friedel (D)

Massachusetts 
 . Silvio O. Conte (R)
 . Edward Boland (D)
 . Philip J. Philbin (D)
 . Harold Donohue (D)
 . F. Bradford Morse (R)
 . William H. Bates (R)
 . Torbert Macdonald (D)
 . Tip O'Neill (D)
 . John W. McCormack (D)
 . Joseph W. Martin Jr. (R)
 . James A. Burke (D)
 . Hastings Keith (R)

Michigan 
 . John Conyers (D)
 . Weston E. Vivian (D)
 . Paul H. Todd Jr. (D)
 . J. Edward Hutchinson (R)
 . Gerald Ford (R)
 . Charles E. Chamberlain (R)
 . John C. Mackie (D)
 . R. James Harvey (R)
 . Robert P. Griffin (R), until May 10, 1966
 Guy Vander Jagt (R), from November 8, 1966
 . Elford Albin Cederberg (R)
 . Raymond F. Clevenger (D)
 . James G. O'Hara (D)
 . Charles Diggs (D)
 . Lucien Nedzi (D)
 . William D. Ford (D)
 . John Dingell (D)
 . Martha Griffiths (D)
 . William Broomfield (R)
 . Billie S. Farnum (D)

Minnesota 
 . Al Quie (R)
 . Ancher Nelsen (R)
 . Clark MacGregor (R)
 . Joseph Karth (DFL)
 . Donald M. Fraser (DFL)
 . Alec G. Olson (DFL)
 . Odin Langen (R)
 . John Blatnik (DFL)

Mississippi 
 . Thomas Abernethy (D)
 . Jamie Whitten (D)
 . John Bell Williams (D)
 . Prentiss Walker (R)
 . William M. Colmer (D)

Missouri 
 . Frank M. Karsten (D)
 . Thomas B. Curtis (R)
 . Leonor Sullivan (D)
 . William J. Randall (D)
 . Richard Walker Bolling (D)
 . William Raleigh Hull Jr. (D)
 . Durward Gorham Hall (R)
 . Richard Howard Ichord Jr. (D)
 . William L. Hungate (D)
 . Paul C. Jones (D)

Montana 
 . Arnold Olsen (D)
 . James F. Battin (R)

Nebraska 
 . Clair Armstrong Callan (D)
 . Glenn Cunningham (R)
 . David Martin (R)

Nevada 
 . Walter S. Baring Jr. (D)

New Hampshire 
 . Joseph Oliva Huot (D)
 . James Colgate Cleveland (R)

New Jersey 
 . William T. Cahill (R)
 . Thomas C. McGrath Jr. (D)
 . James J. Howard (D)
 . Frank Thompson (D)
 . Peter Frelinghuysen Jr. (R)
 . Florence P. Dwyer (R)
 . William B. Widnall (R)
 . Charles Samuel Joelson (D)
 . Henry Helstoski (D)
 . Peter W. Rodino (D)
 . Joseph Minish (D)
 . Paul J. Krebs (D)
 . Cornelius Gallagher (D)
 . Dominick V. Daniels (D)
 . Edward J. Patten (D)

New Mexico 
 . Thomas G. Morris (D)
 . E. S. Johnny Walker (D)

New York 
 . Otis G. Pike (D)
 . James R. Grover Jr. (R)
 . Lester L. Wolff (D)
 . John W. Wydler (R)
 . Herbert Tenzer (D)
 . Seymour Halpern (R)
 . Joseph P. Addabbo (D)
 . Benjamin Stanley Rosenthal (D)
 . James J. Delaney (D)
 . Emanuel Celler (D)
 . Eugene James Keogh (D)
 . Edna F. Kelly (D)
 . Abraham J. Multer (D)
 . John J. Rooney (D)
 . Hugh Carey (D)
 . John M. Murphy (D)
 . John Lindsay (R), until December 31, 1965
 Theodore R. Kupferman (R), from February 8, 1966
 . Adam Clayton Powell Jr. (D)
 . Leonard Farbstein (D)
 . William Fitts Ryan (D)
 . James H. Scheuer (D)
 . Jacob H. Gilbert (D)
 . Jonathan Brewster Bingham (D)
 . Paul A. Fino (R)
 . Richard Ottinger (D)
 . Ogden Reid (R)
 . John G. Dow (D)
 . Joseph Y. Resnick (D)
 . Leo W. O'Brien (D), until December 30, 1966
 . Carleton J. King (R)
 . Robert C. McEwen (R)
 . Alexander Pirnie (R)
 . Howard W. Robison (R)
 . James M. Hanley (D)
 . Samuel S. Stratton (D)
 . Frank Horton (R)
 . Barber Conable (R)
 . Charles Goodell (R)
 . Richard D. McCarthy (D)
 . Henry P. Smith III (R)
 . Thaddeus J. Dulski (D)

North Carolina 
 . Herbert Covington Bonner (D), until November 7, 1965
 Walter B. Jones Sr. (D), from February 5, 1966
 . Lawrence H. Fountain (D)
 . David N. Henderson (D)
 . Harold D. Cooley (D), until December 30, 1966
 . Ralph James Scott (D)
 . Horace R. Kornegay (D)
 . Alton Lennon (D)
 . Charles R. Jonas (R)
 . Jim Broyhill (R)
 . Basil Lee Whitener (D)
 . Roy A. Taylor (D)

North Dakota 
 . Mark Andrews (R)
 . Rolland W. Redlin (D-NPL)

Ohio 
 . Robert E. Sweeney (D)
 . John J. Gilligan (D)
 . Donald D. Clancy (R)
 . Rodney M. Love (D)
 . William Moore McCulloch (R)
 . Del Latta (R)
 . Bill Harsha (R)
 . Clarence J. Brown (R), until August 23, 1965
 Bud Brown (R) from November 2, 1965
 . Jackson Edward Betts (R)
 . Thomas L. Ashley (D)
 . Walter H. Moeller (D)
 . J. William Stanton (R)
 . Samuel L. Devine (R)
 . Charles Adams Mosher (R)
 . William Hanes Ayres (R)
 . Robert T. Secrest (D), until December 30, 1966
 . Frank T. Bow (R)
 . John M. Ashbrook (R)
 . Wayne Hays (D)
 . Michael J. Kirwan (D)
 . Michael A. Feighan (D)
 . Charles Vanik (D)
 . Frances P. Bolton (R)
 . William Edwin Minshall Jr. (R)

Oklahoma 
 . Page Belcher (R)
 . Edmond Edmondson (D)
 . Carl Albert (D)
 . Tom Steed (D)
 . John Jarman (D)
 . Jed Johnson Jr. (D)

Oregon 
 . Wendell Wyatt (R)
 . Al Ullman (D)
 . Edith Green (D)
 . Robert B. Duncan (D)

Pennsylvania 
 . William A. Barrett (D)
 . Robert N. C. Nix Sr. (D)
 . James A. Byrne (D)
 . Herman Toll (D)
 . William J. Green III (D)
 . George M. Rhodes (D)
 . George Watkins (R)
 . Willard S. Curtin (R)
 . Paul B. Dague (R), until December 30, 1966
 . Joseph M. McDade (R)
 . Dan Flood (D)
 . J. Irving Whalley (R)
 . Richard Schweiker (R)
 . William S. Moorhead (D)
 . Fred B. Rooney (D)
 . John C. Kunkel (R), until December 30, 1966
 . Herman T. Schneebeli (R)
 . Robert J. Corbett (R)
 . Nathaniel N. Craley Jr. (D)
 . Elmer J. Holland (D)
 . John Herman Dent (D)
 . John P. Saylor (R)
 . Albert W. Johnson (R)
 . Joseph P. Vigorito (D)
 . Frank M. Clark (D)
 . Thomas E. Morgan (D)
 . James G. Fulton (R)

Rhode Island 
 . Fernand St. Germain (D)
 . John E. Fogarty (D)

South Carolina 
 . L. Mendel Rivers (D)
 . Albert Watson (D), until February 1, 1965
 Albert Watson (R), from June 15, 1965
 . William Jennings Bryan Dorn (D)
 . Robert T. Ashmore (D)
 . Thomas S. Gettys (D)
 . John L. McMillan (D)

South Dakota 
 . Ben Reifel (R)
 . Ellis Yarnal Berry (R)

Tennessee 
 . Jimmy Quillen (R)
 . John Duncan Sr. (R)
 . Bill Brock (R)
 . Joe L. Evins (D)
 . Richard Fulton (D)
 . William Anderson (D)
 . Tom J. Murray (D), until December 30, 1966
 . Fats Everett (D)
 . George W. Grider (D)

Texas 
 . Joe R. Pool (D)
 . Wright Patman (D)
 . Jack Brooks (D)
 . Lindley Beckworth (D)
 . Ray Roberts (D)
 . Earle Cabell (D)
 . Olin E. Teague (D)
 . John Dowdy (D)
 . Albert Thomas (D), until February 15, 1966
 Lera Millard Thomas (D), from March 26, 1966
 . Clark W. Thompson (D), until December 30, 1966
 . J. J. Pickle (D)
 . William R. Poage (D)
 . Jim Wright (D)
 . Graham B. Purcell Jr. (D)
 . John Andrew Young (D)
 . Kika de la Garza (D)
 . Richard Crawford White (D)
 . Omar Burleson (D)
 . Walter E. Rogers (D)
 . George H. Mahon (D)
 . Henry B. González (D)
 . O. C. Fisher (D)
 . Robert R. Casey (D)

Utah 
 . Laurence J. Burton (R)
 . David S. King (D)

Vermont 
 . Robert Stafford (R)

Virginia 
 . Thomas N. Downing (D)
 . Porter Hardy Jr. (D)
 . David E. Satterfield III (D)
 . Watkins Moorman Abbitt (D)
 . William M. Tuck (D)
 . Richard Harding Poff (R)
 . John Otho Marsh Jr. (D)
 . Howard W. Smith (D)
 . W. Pat Jennings (D)
 . Joel Broyhill (R)

Washington 
 . Thomas Pelly (R)
 . Lloyd Meeds (D)
 . Julia Butler Hansen (D)
 . Catherine Dean May (R)
 . Tom Foley (D)
 . Floyd Hicks (D)
 . Brock Adams (D)

West Virginia 
 . Arch A. Moore Jr. (R)
 . Harley Orrin Staggers (D)
 . John M. Slack Jr. (D)
 . Ken Hechler (D)
 . James Kee (D)

Wisconsin 
 . Lynn E. Stalbaum (D)
 . Robert Kastenmeier (D)
 . Vernon Wallace Thomson (R)
 . Clement J. Zablocki (D)
 . Henry S. Reuss (D)
 . John Abner Race (D)
 . Melvin Laird (R)
 . John W. Byrnes (R)
 . Glenn Robert Davis (R)
 . Alvin O'Konski (R)

Wyoming 
 . Teno Roncalio (D)

Non-voting member 
 . Santiago Polanco-Abreu (Resident Commissioner) (PPD)

Changes in membership

Senate
 Replacements: 5
 Democratic: 1-seat net loss
 Republican: 1-seat net gain
 Deaths: 2
 Resignations: 2

|-
| South Carolina(3)
|  | Olin D. Johnston (D)
| Died April 18, 1965.Successor appointed April 22, 1965 to continue the term.
|  | Donald S. Russell (D)
| April 22, 1965

|-
| Virginia(1)
|  | Harry F. Byrd (D)
| Resigned November 10, 1965.Successor appointed November 12, 1965 to continue his father's term.
|  | Harry F. Byrd Jr. (D)
| November 12, 1965

|-
| Michigan(2)
|  | Patrick V. McNamara (D)
| Died April 30, 1966.Successor appointed May 11, 1966 to finish the term.
|  | Robert P. Griffin (R)
| May 11, 1966

|-
| South Carolina(3)
|  | Donald S. Russell (D)
| Interim appointee lost nomination to finish the term.Successor elected November 8, 1966.
|  | Fritz Hollings (D)
| November 9, 1966

|-
| Virginia(2)
|  | Absalom Willis Robertson (D)
| Resigned December 30, 1966, having lost renomination.Successor appointed to finish the term, having already been elected to the next term.
|  | William B. Spong Jr. (D)
| December 31, 1966

|-
| Tennessee(2)
|  | Ross Bass (D)
| Resigned January 2, 1967, having lost renomination.Seat remained vacant until the end of the term (the next day).
| Vacant
| Not filled this term

|}

House of Representatives
 Replacements: 9
 Democratic: no net change
 Republican: no net change
 Deaths: 5
 Resignations: 15
 Total seats with changes: 20

|- 
| 
|  nowrap| Albert Watson (D)
| style="font-size:80%" | Resigned February 1, 1965, after being stripped of seniority by the House Democratic Caucus for supporting Republican Presidential candidate Barry Goldwater.  Was re-elected as a Republican in a special election to replace himself.
|  nowrap | Albert Watson (R)
| June 15, 1965
|- 
| 
|  nowrap| T. Ashton Thompson (D)
| style="font-size:80%" | Died July 1, 1965 
|  nowrap | Edwin Edwards (D)
| October 2, 1965
|- 
| 
|  nowrap| Clarence J. Brown (R)
| style="font-size:80%" | Died August 23, 1965
|  nowrap | Bud Brown (R)
| November 2, 1965
|- 
| 
|  nowrap| James Roosevelt (D)
| style="font-size:80%" | Resigned September 30, 1965, to become the US Representative to the United Nations Economic and Social Council
|  nowrap | Thomas M. Rees (D)
| December 15, 1965
|- 
| 
|  nowrap| Herbert Covington Bonner (D)
| style="font-size:80%" | Died November 7, 1965 
|  nowrap | Walter B. Jones Sr. (D)
| February 5, 1966
|- 
| 
|  nowrap| John Lindsay (R)
| style="font-size:80%" | Resigned December 31, 1965, after being elected Mayor of New York City
|  nowrap | Theodore R. Kupferman (R)
| February 8, 1966
|- 
| 
|  nowrap| Oren Harris (D)
| style="font-size:80%" | Resigned February 3, 1966, to become judge of the US Court of the Eastern and Western Districts of Arkansas
|  nowrap | David Pryor (D)
| November 8, 1966
|- 
| 
|  nowrap| Albert Thomas (D)
| style="font-size:80%" | Died February 15, 1966 
|  nowrap | Lera Millard Thomas (D)
| March 26, 1966
|- 
| 
|  nowrap| John F. Baldwin Jr. (R)
| style="font-size:80%" | Died March 9, 1966
|  nowrap | Jerome Waldie (D)
| June 7, 1966
|- 
| 
|  nowrap| Robert P. Griffin (R)
| style="font-size:80%" | Resigned May 10, 1966, after being appointed to the U.S. Senate
|  nowrap | Guy Vander Jagt (R)
| November 8, 1966
|- 
| 
|  nowrap| Ralph Julian Rivers (D)
| style="font-size:80%" | Resigned December 30, 1966
| rowspan=10 |Vacant
| rowspan=10 |Not filled this term
|- 
| 
|  nowrap| Winfield K. Denton (D)
| style="font-size:80%" | Resigned December 30, 1966
|- 
| 
|  nowrap| Ralph Harvey (R)
| style="font-size:80%" | Resigned December 30, 1966
|- 
| 
|  nowrap| Leo W. O'Brien (D)
| style="font-size:80%" | Resigned December 30, 1966
|- 
| 
|  nowrap| Harold D. Cooley (D)
| style="font-size:80%" | Resigned December 30, 1966
|- 
| 
|  nowrap| Robert T. Secrest (D)
| style="font-size:80%" | Resigned December 30, 1966
|- 
| 
|  nowrap| Paul B. Dague (R)
| style="font-size:80%" | Resigned December 30, 1966
|- 
| 
|  nowrap| John C. Kunkel (R)
| style="font-size:80%" | Resigned December 30, 1966
|- 
| 
|  nowrap| Tom J. Murray (D)
| style="font-size:80%" | Resigned December 30, 1966
|- 
| 
|  nowrap| Clark W. Thompson (D)
| style="font-size:80%" | Resigned December 30, 1966
|}

Committees

Senate

 Aeronautical and Space Sciences (Chairman: Clinton P. Anderson; Ranking Member: Margaret Chase Smith)
 Agriculture and Forestry (Chairman: Allen J. Ellender; Ranking Member: George D. Aiken)
 Appropriations (Chairman: Carl Hayden; Ranking Member: Leverett Saltonstall)
 Armed Services (Chairman: Richard B. Russell; Ranking Member: Leverett Saltonstall)
 Banking and Currency (Chairman: A. Willis Robertson; Ranking Member: Wallace F. Bennett)
 Commerce (Chairman: Warren G. Magnuson; Ranking Member: Norris Cotton)
 District of Columbia (Chairman: Alan Bible; Ranking Member: Winston L. Prouty)
 Finance (Chairman: Russell B. Long; Ranking Member: John J. Williams)
 Foreign Relations (Chairman: J. William Fulbright; Ranking Member: Bourke B. Hickenlooper)
 Government Operations (Chairman: John Little McClellan; Ranking Member: Karl E. Mundt)
 Interior and Insular Affairs (Chairman: Henry M. Jackson; Ranking Member: Thomas H. Kuchel)
 Judiciary (Chairman: James O. Eastland; Ranking Member: Everett Dirksen)
 Labor and Public Welfare (Chairman: J. Lister Hill; Ranking Member: Jacob K. Javits)
 Organization of Congress (Select)
 Post Office and Civil Service (Chairman: A.S. Mike Monroney; Ranking Member: Frank Carlson)
 Public Works (Chairman: Pat McNamara; Ranking Member: John Sherman Cooper)
 Rules and Administration (Chairman: B. Everett Jordan; Ranking Member: Carl T. Curtis)
 Small Business (Select) (Chairman: John J. Sparkman)
 Standards and Conduct (Select)
 Whole

House of Representatives

 Agriculture (Chairman: Harold D. Cooley; Ranking Member: Paul B. Dague)
 Appropriations (Chairman: George H. Mahon; Ranking Member: Frank T. Bow)
 Armed Services (Chairman: L. Mendel Rivers; Ranking Member: William H. Bates)
 Banking and Currency (Chairman: Wright Patman; Ranking Member: William B. Widnall)
 District of Columbia (Chairman: John L. McMillan; Ranking Member: Ancher Nelsen)
 Education and Labor (Chairman: Adam Clayton Powell; Ranking Member: William H. Ayres)
 Foreign Affairs (Chairman: Thomas E. Morgan; Ranking Member: Frances P. Bolton)
 Government Operations (Chairman: William L. Dawson; Ranking Member: Clarence J. Brown)
 House Administration (Chairman: Omar Burleson; Ranking Member: Glenard P. Lipscomb)
 Interior and Insular Affairs (Chairman: Wayne N. Aspinall; Ranking Member: John P. Saylor)
 Interstate and Foreign Commerce (Chairman: Oren Harris; Ranking Member: William L. Springer)
 Judiciary (Chairman: Emanuel Celler; Ranking Member: William M. McCulloch)
 Merchant Marine and Fisheries (Chairman: Edward A. Garmatz; Ranking Member: William S. Mailliard)
 Post Office and Civil Service (Chairman: Tom J. Murray; Ranking Member: Robert J. Corbett)
 Public Works (Chairman: George Hyde Fallon; Ranking Member: William C. Cramer)
 Rules (Chairman: Howard W. Smith; Ranking Member: Clarence J. Brown)
 Science and Astronautics (Chairman: George Paul Miller; Ranking Member: Joseph W. Martin Jr.)
 Small Business (Select) (Chairman: Joe L. Evins)
 Standards of Official Conduct
 Un-American Activities (Chairman: Edwin E. Willis; Ranking Member: John M. Ashbrook)
 Veterans' Affairs (Chairman: Olin E. Teague; Ranking Member: E. Ross Adair)
 Ways and Means (Chairman: Wilbur D. Mills; Ranking Member: John W. Byrnes)
 Whole

Joint committees

 Atomic Energy (Chairman: Rep. Chet Holifield; Vice Chairman: Sen. John O. Pastore) 
 Conditions of Indian Tribes (Special)
 Construction of a Building for a Museum of History and Technology for the Smithsonian
 Defense Production (Chairman: Sen. A. Willis Robertson; Vice Chairman: Rep. Wright Patman)
 Disposition of Executive Papers
 Economic (Chairman: Rep. Wright Patman; Vice Chairman: Sen. Paul H. Douglas)
 Immigration and Nationality Policy (Chairman: Rep. Michael A. Feighan)
 Legislative Budget
 The Library (Chairman: Rep. Omar Burleson; Vice Chairman: Sen. B. Everett Jordan)
 Navajo-Hopi Indian Administration
 Organization of Congress 
 Printing (Chairman: Sen. Carl Hayden; Vice Chairman: Rep. Omar Burleson)
 Reduction of Nonessential Federal Expenditures (Chairman: Vacant; Vice Chairman: Vacant)
 Taxation (Chairman: Rep. Wilbur D. Mills; Vice Chairman: Sen. Harry F. Byrd)

Employees

Legislative branch agency directors
 Architect of the Capitol: J. George Stewart
 Attending Physician of the United States Congress: George Calver, until 1966
 Rufus Pearson, from 1966
 Comptroller General of the United States: Joseph Campbell, until July 31, 1965, vacant thereafter
 vacant, July 31, 1965 – March 8, 1966
 Elmer B. Staats, from March 8, 1966
 Librarian of Congress: Lawrence Quincy Mumford 
 Public Printer of the United States: James L. Harrison

Senate
 Chaplain: Frederick Brown Harris (Methodist)
 Parliamentarian: Floyd Riddick
 Secretary: Felton McLellan Johnston, until December 30, 1965 
 Emery L. Frazier, January 1, 1966 – September 30, 1966
 Francis R. Valeo, from October 1, 1966
 Librarian: Richard D. Hupman
 Democratic Party Secretary: Francis R. Valeo, until 1966
 J. Stanley Kimmitt, from 1966
 Republican Party Secretary: J. Mark Trice
 Sergeant at Arms: Joseph C. Duke, until December 30, 1965 
 Robert G. Dunphy, from January 14, 1966

House of Representatives
 Chaplain: Bernard Braskamp (Presbyterian)
 Clerk: Ralph R. Roberts
 Doorkeeper: William M. Miller
 Postmaster: H. H. Morris
 Parliamentarian: Lewis Deschler
 Reading Clerks: Charles W. Hackney Jr. (D) and Joe Bartlett (R) 
 Sergeant at Arms: Zeake W. Johnson

Footnotes

See also
 1964 United States elections (elections leading to this Congress)
 1964 United States presidential election
 1964 United States Senate elections
 1964 United States House of Representatives elections
 1966 United States elections (elections during this Congress, leading to the next Congress)
 1966 United States Senate elections
 1966 United States House of Representatives elections

Notes

References
 Biographical Directory of the U.S. Congress
 U.S. House of Representatives: Congressional History
 U.S. Senate: Statistics and Lists

External links